The 5th Annual Latin Grammy Awards were held on Wednesday, September 1, 2004, at the Shrine Auditorium in Los Angeles.

This was the last telecast of the awards nationally in the United States in English with a CBS contract.  Effective in 2005, the awards were announced in Spanish with an exclusive Spanish-language telecast. Alejandro Sanz was the big winner winning four awards including Album of the Year.

Awards
Winners are in bold text.

General
Record of the Year
Alejandro Sanz — "No Es Lo Mismo" 
Maria Rita — "A Festa"
Robi Draco Rosa — "Más y Más"
Skank — "Dois Rios"
Bebo Valdés and Diego El Cigala — "Lágrimas Negras"
Julieta Venegas — "Andar Conmigo"

Album of the Year
Alejandro Sanz — No Es Lo Mismo
Café Tacuba — Cuatro Caminos
Kevin Johansen — Sur O No Sur
Maria Rita — Maria Rita
Bebo Valdés and Diego El Cigala — Lágrimas Negras

Song of the Year
Alejandro Sanz — "No Es Lo Mismo"
Coti Sorokin and Julieta Venegas — "Andar Conmigo" (Julieta Venegas)
Emmanuel del Real — "Eres" (Café Tacuba)
Kevin Johansen — "La Procesión"
Luis Gómez Escolar, Robi Draco Rosa and Itaal Shur — "Más y Más" (Robi Draco Rosa)

Best New Artist
Maria Rita
Akwid
Obie Bermúdez
Mauricio & Palodeagua
Superlitio

Pop
Best Female Pop Vocal Album
Rosario — De Mil Colores
Rocío Dúrcal — Caramelito
Ednita Nazario — Por Ti
Paulina Rubio — Pau-Latina
Jaci Velasquez — Milagro

Best Male Pop Vocal Album
Alejandro Sanz — No Es Lo Mismo
Obie Bermúdez — Confesiones
David Bisbal — Bulería
Ricky Martin — Almas del Silencio
Luis Miguel — 33

Best Pop Album by a Duo/Group with Vocals
Sin Bandera — De Viaje
Area 305 — Hay Que Cambiar
Estopa — ¿La calle es tuya?
La Oreja de Van Gogh — Lo que te conté mientras te hacías la dormida
Los Tri-O — Canciones del Alma de Marco Antonio Solís

Urban
Best Urban Music Album
Vico C — En Honor A La Verdad
Akwid — Proyecto Akwid
Control Machete — Uno, Dos: Bandera
DJ Kane — DJ Kane
Juan Gotti — No Sett Trippin

Rock
Best Rock Solo Vocal Album
Julieta Venegas — Sí
Charly García — Rock & Roll Yo
Alejandra Guzmán — Lipstick
Fito Páez — Naturaleza Sangre
Luis Alberto Spinetta — Para Los Árboles

Best Rock Album by a Duo/Group with Vocals
La Ley — Libertad
Bersuit Vergarabat — La Argentinidad al Palo
Café Quijano — ¡Qué grande es esto del amor!
Divididos — Vivo Acá
El Tri — Alex Lora: 35 Años y lo Que le Falta Todavía

Best Alternative Music Album
Café Tacuba — Cuatro Caminos
Babasónicos — Infame
Kinky — Atlas
Ozomatli — Coming Up
Plastilina Mosh — Hola Chicuelos

Best Rock Song
Emmanuel del Real — "Eres" (Café Tacuba)
Ismael "Tito" Fuentes — "Here We Kum" (Molotov)
Miguel "Mickey" Huidobro — "Hit Me" (Molotov)
Desmond Child, Alejandra Guzmán and Jodi Marr — "Lipstick" (Alejandra Guzmán)
Beto Cuevas — "Mi Ley" (La Ley)

Tropical
Best Salsa Album
Celia Cruz — Regalo del Alma
Los Van Van — Van Van Live at Miami Arena
Víctor Manuelle — Travesía
Tito Nieves — Tito Nieves canta con el Conjunto Clásico: 25 Aniversario Recuerdos
Jerry Rivera — Canto a Mi Ídolo… Frankie Ruiz

Best Merengue Album
Johnny Ventura — Sin Desperdicio
Alex Bueno — 20 Años Después
Gisselle — Contra la Marea
Grupo Manía — Hombres de Honor
Limi-T 21 — Como Nunca… Como Siempre

Best Contemporary Tropical Album
Albita — Albita Llegó
Andy Andy — Necesito Un Amor
Huey Dunbar — Music For My Peoples
Frank Reyes — Cuando Se Quiere Se Puede
Mickey Taveras — Sigo Siendo Romántico

Best Traditional Tropical Album
Bebo Valdés and Diego El Cigala — Lágrimas Negras
Las Hermanas Márquez — Paquito D’Rivera Presents las Hermanas Márquez
Manny Manuel — Serenata
Danny Rivera and "El Topo" Antonio Cabán Vale — Amigos del Alma
Tropicana All Stars — Tropicana All Stars Recuerda A Benny Moré

Best Tropical Song
Sergio George and Fernando Osorio — "Ríe y Llora" (Celia Cruz)
Albita — "Albita Llegó"
Raúl del Sol and Jorge Luis Piloto — "Creo en el Amor" (Rey Ruiz)
Gian Marco — "Hoy" (Gloria Estefan)
Emilio Estefan, Jr. and Víctor Manuelle — "Tengo Ganas (Salsa)" (Víctor Manuelle)

Singer-Songwriter
Best Singer-Songwriter Album
Soraya — Soraya
Juan Gabriel — Inocente de Ti
León Gieco — El Vivo de León
Alejandro Lerner — Buen Viaje
Joan Sebastian — Que Amarren A Cúpido
Joan Manuel Serrat — Serrat Sinfónico

Regional Mexican
Best Ranchero Album
Vicente Fernández and Alejandro Fernández — En Vivo: Juntos Por Ultima Vez
Pepe Aguilar — Con Orgullo Por Herencia
Vicente Fernández — Se Me Hizo Tarde la Vida
Pablo Montero — Gracias… Homenaje A Javier Solis
Marco Antonio Solís — Tu Amor o Tu Desprecio

Best Banda Album
Banda El Recodo — Por Ti
Cuisillos de Arturo Macias — Corazón
El Coyote y su Banda Tierra Santa — El Rancho Grande
Los Horóscopos de Durango — Puras de Rompe y Rasga
Lupillo Rivera — Live! en Concierto — Universal Amphitheatre

Best Grupero Album
Alicia Villarreal — Cuando el Corazón Se Cruza
Ana Bárbara — Te Atraparé… Bandido
Bronco el Gigante de América — Siempre Arriba
Ninel Conde — Ninel Conde
Mariana — Seré Una Niña Buena

Best Tejano Album
Jimmy González & El Grupo Mazz — Live en el Valle
La Tropa F — Un Nuevo Capítulo
Little Joe & La Familia — Celebration Of Life - Volume Two Live
Bobby Pulido — Móntame
Sólido — Vuelve

Best Norteño Album
Los Tigres del Norte — Pacto de Sangre
Ramón Ayala y Sus Bravos del Norte — Titere en Tus Manos/El Invicto
Conjunto Primavera — Decide Tú
Los Palominos — Canciones de la Rockola
Michael Salgado — Entre Copas

Best Regional Mexican Song
Marco Antonio Solís — "Tu Amor o Tu Desprecio"
Roberto Martínez — "¿A Donde Estabas?" (Intocable)
Mario Quintero Lara — "Imperio" (Los Tucanes de Tijuana)
José Cantoral — "José Pérez León" (Los Tigres del Norte)
Freddie Martinez — "Titere en Tus Manos" (Ramón Ayala y Sus Bravos del Norte)

Instrumental
Best Instrumental Album
Yo-Yo Ma — Obrigado Brazil Live In Concert
Armandinho — Retocando O Choro
Paulo Moura — Estação Leopoldina
Ricardo Silveira — Noite Clara
Tanghetto — Emigrante (Electrotango)

Traditional
Best Folk Album
Kepa Junkera — K
Manuel Alejandro — Manuel Alejandro y Punto: Homenaje Al Grupo Haciendo Punto en Otro Son
Ecos de Borinquen — Jíbaro Hasta el Hueso: Mountain Music of Puerto Rico
Horacio Guarany — Cantor de Cantores
Perú Negro — Jolgorio
Radio Tarifa — Fiebre
 
Best Tango Album
Gerardo Gandini — Postangos en Vivo en Rosario
Pablo Mainetti — Tres Rincones
María Estela Monti — Ciudadana
Orquesta El Arranque — En Vivo en el Auditorio de la Rete Due de Suiza
María Volonté and Horacio Larumbe — Fuimos

Best Flamenco Album
Paco de Lucía — Cositas Buenas
Raimundo Amador — Isla Menor
El Pele and Vicente Amigo — Canto
Lebrijano — Yo Me Llamo Juan
Enrique Morente — El Pequeño Reloj

Jazz
Best Latin Jazz Album
Chucho Valdés — New Conceptions
Jerry Gonzalez y Los Piratas del Flamenco — Jerry Gonzalez y los Piratas del Flamenco
Santos Neto Quinteto — Canto Do Rio Jovino
Diego Urcola — Soundances
Bebo Valdés and Federico Britos — We Could Make Such Beautiful Music Together

Christian
Best Christian Album (Spanish language)
Marcos Witt — Recordando Otra Vez
Carlos Guzman — En las Alas de Una Paloma
Samuel Hernández — Jesús Siempre Llega A Tiempo
Rojo — 24/7
Coalo Zamorano — Cosas Poderosas

Best Christian Album (Portuguese Language)
Aline Barros — Fruto de Amor
Teus Igreja Batista and Nova Jerusalém — Discípulos
Fernanda Lara y Giordani Vidal — Livre Para Amar
Padre Marcelo Rossi — Maria Mãe Do Filho de Deus (Trilha Sonora Original do Filme)
Gospel Thales — Acústico

Brazilian
Best Brazilian Contemporary Pop Album
Carlinhos Brown — Carlinhos Brown Es Carlito Marrón
Roberto Carlos — Pra Sempre
Jota Quest — MTV Ao Vivo
Rita Lee — Balacobaco
Daniela Mercury — Carnaval Eletrônico
O Rappa — O Silêncio Q Precede o Esporro
Ivete Sangalo — Clube Carnavalesco Inocentes em Progresso
 
Best Brazilian Rock Album
Skank — Cosmotron
Roberto Frejat — Sobre Nós 2 e O Resto do Mundo
Los Hermanos — Ventura
Os Paralamas do Sucesso — Uns Dias Ao Vivo
Pitty — Admirável Chip Novo

Best Samba/Pagode Album
Nana, Dori and Danilo — Para Caymmi. de Nana, Dori e Danilo
Jorge Aragão — Da Noite Pro Dia
Monarco — Uma Historia do Samba
Zeca Pagodinho — Acústico MTV
Velha Guarda Do Salgueiro — Velha Guarda do Salgueiro

Best MPB Album
Maria Rita — Maria Rita
Maria Bethânia — Brasileirinho
Gal Costa — Todas as Coisas e Eu
Guinga — Noturno Copacabana
Cesar Camargo Mariano and Pedro Mariano — Piano y Voz

Best Romantic Music Album
Zezé di Camargo & Luciano — Zezé di Camargo y Luciano
Ataíde & Alexandre — Momento Especial
Bruno & Marrone — Inevitável
Juliano Cezar — O Cowboy Vagabundo-Vida de Peão
Leonardo — Brincadeira Tem Hora
Marciano — Ao Vivo-Meu Ofício é Cantar
 
Best Brazilian Roots/Regional Album
Banda de Pífanos de Caruaru — No Século XXI, no Pátio do Forró
Ara Ketu — Obrigado a Você
Cascabulho — É Caco de Vidro Puro
Maria Dapaz — Luiz Gonzaga na Voz de Maria Dapaz-Vida de Viajante
Liu & Léu — Jeitão de Caboclo
Sérgio Reis and Filhos — Violas e Violeiros

Best Brazilian Song
Milton Nascimento — "A Festa" (Maria Rita)
Joyce — "A Banda" (Joyce and Banda Maluca)
Roberto de Carvalho, Arnaldo Jabor and Rita Lee — "Amor e Sexo" (Rita Lee)
Lô Borges, Nando Reis and Samuel Rosa — "Dois Rios" (Skank)
Roberto Carlos — "Pra Sempre"
Lucas, Fernando Mendes and José Wilson — "Você Não Me Ensinou a Te Esquecer" (Caetano Veloso)

Children's
Best Latin Children's Album
Niños Adorando — Niños Adorando 2
Alegrijes y Rebujos — Disco
Tatiana — El Regalo
Various Artists — Canciones Con Acción Para Niños
Xuxa — Só Para Baixinhos 4

Classical
Best Classical Album
Various Artists — Jobim Sinfônico
Orquestra Simfònica de Barcelona I Nacional de Catalunya — Carmen Symphony
Uakti — Clássicos
Various Artists — Eugenio Toussaint Música de Cámara
Trío Argentino — Schubert - Fauré
Joao Carlos Assis Brasil — Villa-Lobos Bachianas Brasileiras Nº 4 e Cirandas João

Production
Best Engineered Album
Rafa Sardina — No Es Lo Mismo (Alejandro Sanz)
Moogie Canazio and Gabriel Pinheiro — Brasileirinho (Maria Bethânia)
Pepe Loeches — Lágrimas Negras (Bebo Valdés and Diego El Cigala)
Álvaro Alencar and Tom Capone — Maria Rita (Maria Rita)
 Eric Schilling, Al Schmit and Armin Steiner — Trumpet Evolution (Arturo Sandoval)

Producer of the Year
Javier Limón
Claudia Brant, Chuy Flores, Jeeve and Gen Rubin
Tom Capone
Sebastian Krys
Gustavo Santaolalla

Music Video
Best Music Video
Robi Draco Rosa — "Más y Más"
Café Tacuba — "Eres"
Kevin Johansen — "La Procesión"
Molotov — "Hit Me"
Roselyn Sánchez — "Amor Amor"

Special Awards
Lifetime Achievement Awards
Mercedes Sosa
José José
Roberto Carlos
Willie Colón
Antonio Aguilar

Trustees Award
Manuel Esperón

References

Latin Grammy Awards by year
Latin Grammy Awards
Grammy Awards
Annual Latin Grammy Awards
Annual Latin Grammy Awards